Devikhindi is a village in Khanapur (Vita) taluka of Sangli district of Maharashtra in India.
It belongs to Desh or Paschim Maharashtra region. It is situated 21km away from sub-district headquarter Vita and 75km away from district headquarter Sangli. As per 2009 stats, Devikhindi village is also a gram panchayat.

The total geographical area of village is 2457.91 hectares. Devikhindi has a total population of 2,212 peoples. There are about 562 houses in Devikhindi village. Vita is nearest town to Devikhindi which is approximately 21km away.

Places Near
Vita
Bhood
Lengare

References 

Villages in Sangli district